Ehlanzeni is one of the 3 districts of Mpumalanga province of South Africa. The seat of Ehlanzeni is Mbombela. The majority of its 944 665 people speak SiSwati (2001 Census). The district code is DC32.

Geography

Neighbours 
Ehlanzeni is surrounded by:
 Mopani (DC33) to the north 
 The republic of Mozambique to the east
 The kingdom of Eswatini to the south
 Gert Sibande (DC30) to the south
 Nkangala (DC31) to the south-west
 Sekhukhune (CBDC3) to the north-west

Local municipalities 
The district contains the following local municipalities:

Bushbuckridge was Lowveld Local Municipality.

Demographics
The following statistics are from the 2001 census.

Gender

Ethnic group

Age

Politics

Election results 
Election results for Ehlanzeni in the South African general election, 2004. 
 Population 18 and over: 537 768 [56.93% of total population] 
 Total votes: 333 737 [35.33% of total population] 
 Voting % estimate: 62.06% votes as a % of population 18 and over

References

External links
 Ehlanzeni DM official website

District municipalities of Mpumalanga
Ehlanzeni District Municipality